Robert Taylor III (born December 28, 1973) is a former American college and professional football player who was a cornerback in the National Football League (NFL) for ten seasons.  He played college football for the University of Notre Dame, and earned All-American honors.  A second-round draft pick, he played professionally for the Philadelphia Eagles and Seattle Seahawks of the NFL.

Early life
Taylor was born in Houston, Texas. He attended Longview High School in Longview, Texas, and played high school football for the Longview Lobos and was also a member of the Lobos' Texas Class 5A state basketball championship team.  In addition to playing for the Lobos 1992 Basketball State Championship Team; Taylor was a three-year starter for the Lobos in football he ran a leg on the state champion 1,600-meter relay squad.  He was inducted into the Texas High School Football Hall of Fame's 2012 class. Taylor was a two-time Class 5A all-state pick for football, and named to the first-team defense on the UIL all-century team in 2009.  These accolades earned him as the first player in Longview Lobo history to have his jersey, No. 24, retired.

College career
Taylor attended the University of Notre Dame, where he played for the Notre Dame Fighting Irish football team from 1992 to 1994.  As a Junior in 1994, was recognized as a consensus first-team All-American.

Professional career
Taylor was selected in the second round of the 1995 NFL Draft by the Philadelphia Eagles. He played for the Eagles from  until . He was selected for one Pro Bowl during his time as an Eagle, following the  season in which he had five interceptions and a touchdown return. He was also a second-team All-Pro selection in 2002.

In ten NFL seasons, he appeared in 129 regular season games, started 109 of them, amassed 384 tackles and four quarterback sacks, with 19 interceptions for 224 interception return yards and two touchdowns. He also compiled 11 fumble recoveries and six forced fumbles.

NFL statistics

Key
 GP: games played
 COMB: combined tackles
 TOTAL: total tackles
 AST: assisted tackles
 SACK: sacks
 FF: forced fumbles
 FR: fumble recoveries
 FR YDS: fumble return yards 
 INT: interceptions
 IR YDS: interception return yards
 AVG IR: average interception return
 LNG: longest interception return
 TD: interceptions returned for touchdown
 PD: passes defensed

Personal

Taylor's father, Robert Taylor, won a gold medal and a silver medal in the 1972 Summer Olympics while attending Texas Southern University in Houston.

Taylor appeared on an episode of MTV Cribs.

Bobby is married to Michelle Melecio Taylor, and has three sons.

References

1973 births
Living people
People from Longview, Texas
Longview High School alumni
All-American college football players
American football cornerbacks
National Conference Pro Bowl players
Notre Dame Fighting Irish football players
Philadelphia Eagles players
Players of American football from Houston
Seattle Seahawks players
Ed Block Courage Award recipients